Miquel Buch i Moya (born 3 August 1975) is a Spanish politician from Catalonia, Minister of the Interior of the autonomous community between 2018 and 2020. He was previously mayor of Premià de Mar, a municipality in north-eastern Spain.

Early life
Buch was born on 3 August 1975 in Premià de Mar, Catalonia. He joined the Nationalist Youth of Catalonia (Joventut Nacionalista de Catalunya, JNC) and Democratic Convergence of Catalonia (CDC) in 1996. He was national counsellor for JNC from 1997 to 2006 and for CDC since 2004. He was a doorman in Titus discotheque in Badalona.

Career
Buch worked for the family business and the Red Cross before entering local politics. Buch contested the 1999 local elections as a Convergence and Union (CiU) electoral alliance candidate in Premià de Mar but failed to get elected. However, following the death of Lluís Cerdà he was appointed to the municipal council. He was re-elected at the 2003 local elections. After the election CiU formed an administration and Buch was appointed Deputy Mayor. He became Mayor of Premià de Mar following the death of Jaume Batlle i Garriga in February 2007. He was re-elected at the 2007, 2011 and 2015 local elections.

Buch has served as president of the Catalan Association of Municipalities and Counties (ACMC), president of the Council of Local Government of Catalonia and vice-president of the Association of Municipalities for Independence. He was also a member of the provincial deputation for Barcelona.

Buch resigned as mayor in December 2017. At the 2017 regional election Buch was placed 22nd on the Together for Catalonia (JuntsxCat) list of candidates in the Province of Barcelona but the alliance only managed to win 17 seats in the province and as a result he was not elected to the Parliament of Catalonia. At the election Catalan secessionists retained a slim majority in the Catalan Parliament. On 19 May 2018 newly elected President Quim Torra nominated a new government in which Buch was to be Minister of the Interior. He was sworn in on 2 June 2018 at the Palau de la Generalitat de Catalunya.

In July 2020 Buch joined the newly formed Together for Catalonia political party.

Personal life
Buch is married to Cesca and has three children - Oriol, Biel and Clara. At 21 he was diagnosed with multiple sclerosis.

Electoral history

References

External links
 
 

1975 births
Catalan European Democratic Party politicians
Convergence and Union politicians
Democratic Convergence of Catalonia politicians
Interior ministers of Catalonia
Living people
Mayors of places in Catalonia
People from Premià de Mar
People with multiple sclerosis
Together for Catalonia (2017) politicians
Together for Catalonia (2020) politicians
Torra Government